Stanwell Moor is a village and moor in the Borough of Spelthorne, approximately  west of central London. Historically part of the county of Middlesex, it was transferred to Surrey in 1965.

The River Colne runs to the west of the moor and the village is in Colne Valley regional park.

It is part of the same ward and ecclesiastical parish.

History and geography

The locality gained its main barrier from what had always been its village in the early 1960s, a dual carriageway, and it hived off shortly after with the building of a community hall and establishment of its own residents' association.  It is however, ecclesiastically, still strongly tied with Stanwell in the Church of England, its parish.  Fewer than six of the original medieval buildings stand in the hamlet.

It sits on the part of the parish on strongly fertile, partly densely wooded, alluvial soil, whereas most of Stanwell was associated with the stony ground which makes up gravel deposits near to the surface of the soil, as throughout the area south of Heathrow Airport to the River Thames.

Local government
The community is in the Stanwell North ward, as used by Spelthorne and for certain statistical purposes.

Amenities
A parade of shops is here, followed at one end by a pub. Distributaries of the complex River Colne runs past Stanwell Moor where it forms a broad part of the Colne Valley regional park. Stanwell Moor is buffered from all other settlements.  Its south is covered by the King George VI Reservoir after which is Staines upon Thames.  South-west is the Wraysbury Reservoir.

Demography and housing

The average level of accommodation in the region composed of detached houses was 28%, the average that was apartments was 22.6%.

The proportion of households in the settlement who owned their home outright compares to the regional average of 35.1%.  The proportion who owned their home with a loan compares to the regional average of 32.5%.  The remaining % is made up of rented dwellings (plus a negligible % of households living rent-free).

Gallery

References

External links

Villages in Surrey
Borough of Spelthorne
Places formerly in Middlesex